PlayAlong is a massively multiplayer dual screen interactive experience, synchronized with TV shows. It can be used via various devices such as PC, Mac, tablets or smartphones.

It was created by Visiware in 2010 and has already been used for various TV shows, and allowed TV viewers to play with the candidates of TV shows as they were broadcast.

Eventually, PlayAlong will be used for many other social television purposes such as interactive advertising, main sports events, or polling, voting, quizzes and debates during TV shows.

Different use of PlayAlong

Million Pound Drop
Rette die Million! (ZDF - Germany)
Show me the Money Live (SBS6 - Netherlands)
Atrapa un millón (Antena 3 - Spain)
Million Dollar Money Drop (Fox - United States)
Money Drop (TF1 - France)
Um Milhão na Mesa (SBT - Brazil)
A 40 Milliós Játszma (TV2 - Hungary)
RM 1,000,000 Money Drop (Astro Ria- Malaysia)

Interactive television